Kotmale is a village in Sri Lanka in Central Province. Kotmale forms part of a mountainous region that the Sinhalese kings left forested to generate sufficient rainfall for rice cultivation in the valleys below.

The Sinhalese prince Dutugamunu is said to have taken refuge in Kotmale to escape the wrath of his father, King Kavantissa. Kotmale is also where the Kandyan Kings hid the sacred tooth relic during periods of political instability, the last occasion being during the British occupation in 1815.

Attractions 
Construction of the dam commenced in 1977 and was completed in 1995.
It is the largest stupa constructed in the country in over 1,300 years. It serves as a reminder of the eighteen shrines/temples that were submerged with the construction of the Kotmale reservoir. It cost approximately Rs. 300 million to build.
 Kotmale Hanging Bridge, a wooden suspension bridge. The bridge spans  over the Mahaweli River.

See also 
 Upper Kotmale Dam
 List of towns in Central Province, Sri Lanka

Further reading

References 

Populated places in Nuwara Eliya District